Peter Assion (born 24 August 1959) is a German Association football manager and former footballer.

External links
 
 

1959 births
Living people
German footballers
German football managers
SSV Ulm 1846 players
SC Austria Lustenau players
SC Austria Lustenau managers
Association football defenders
FC Memmingen players
FC Red Bull Salzburg managers
German expatriate football managers
Expatriate football managers in Austria